Bohner (also Boehner) is a surname of German origin. Notable people with the surname include:

People
Gerd Bohner (born 1959), German scientist
John Boehner (born 1949), American politician
Kate Bohner (born 1967), American journalist and writer
Philotheus Boehner (1901–1955), German scholar and member of the Franciscan order

Fictional characters
Ralph Bohner, character in the Marvel Cinematic Universe, introduced in the miniseries WandaVision

See also
Bohner Stream, river of Antarctica

German-language surnames